Gunalan a/l Padathan (born 11 September 1981) is a Malaysian footballer who plays as a defender for Petaling Jaya City FC in the Super League Malaysia.

Honours

Club
Selangor
 Division 1 / Premier 1 / Super League
 Winners (2): 2009, 2010
 Runner-up (1): 2002
 Division 2 /Premier 2 / Premier League
 Winners (1): 2005
 Charity Cup
 Winners (3): 2002, 2009, 2010
 Runner-up (3): 2003, 2006, 2011
 Malaysia Cup
 Winners (2): 2002, 2005 
 Runner-up (1): 2008
FA Cup
 Winners (3): 2001,2005, 2009
 Runner-up (1): 2008

PKNS
FA Cup
 Runner-up (1): 2016
Premier League
 runners-up (1): 2016

References

External links
 

1981 births
Living people
Association football defenders
Malaysian footballers
Malaysia international footballers
Malaysia Super League players
Selangor FA players
PKNS F.C. players
People from Selangor
Malaysian people of Tamil descent
Malaysian sportspeople of Indian descent